Andrea Růžičková (born 21 July 1984) is a Slovak actress and model. She has starred in TV series including Světla pasáže and Vyprávěj, as well as the film Rafťáci.

Kerestešová married musician Mikoláš Růžička in 2016, adopting the surname Růžičková. She had a son in August 2017.

Selected filmography 
Rafťáci (2006)
Vyprávěj (television, 2010)
 (2014)

References

External links

1984 births
Living people
Slovak film actresses
Slovak television actresses
Slovak female models
People from Vranov nad Topľou District
21st-century Slovak actresses